Parahypsos piersoni is a species of combtooth blenny found in coral reefs in the eastern Pacific ocean, from Costa Rica to Peru. The specific name honours C.J. Pierson, who was a member of the expedition to Panama on which the type was collected.

References

Salarinae
Fish of the Pacific Ocean
Fish of Costa Rica
Fish of Peru
Marine fauna of South America
Western Central American coastal fauna
Taxa named by Charles Henry Gilbert
Taxa named by Edwin Chapin Starks
Fish described in 1904